Micaela Ramazzotti (born 17 January 1979) is an Italian actress.
Her film credits include Non prendere impegni stasera, The First Beautiful Thing and The Big Heart of the Girls.  Ramazzotti was a regular cast member of the show Crimini bianchi.

Awards
She won the David di Donatello for Best Actress for her role in The First Beautiful Thing in 2010.

Personal life
She married film director, writer and producer Paolo Virzì, on January 17, 2009, in Livorno. Together they have 2 children: Jacopo (born 1 March 2010) and Anna (15 April 2013).

Ramazzotti and Virzì separated in November 2018 and reconciled in February 2019.

Filmography

References

External links

Living people
Italian film actresses
David di Donatello winners
Nastro d'Argento winners
Italian television actresses
Actresses from Rome
21st-century Italian actresses
1979 births